The 1957 NCAA Tennis Championships were the 12th annual NCAA-sponsored tournaments to determine the national champions of men's singles, doubles, and team collegiate tennis in the United States.

Michigan won the team championship, the Wolverines' first such title. Michigan finished just one point ahead of Tulane, 10–9, in the final team standings.

Barry MacKay won the Singles Title over Sammy Giammalva of Texas in 5 sets.

Host site
This year's tournaments were contested at the Eccles Tennis Center at the University of Utah in Salt Lake City, Utah.

Team scoring
Until 1977, the men's team championship was determined by points awarded based on individual performances in the singles and doubles events.

References

External links
List of NCAA Men's Tennis Champions

NCAA Division I tennis championships
NCAA Division I Tennis Championships
NCAA Division I Tennis Championships